Orsk is a former airbase of the Russian Air Force located northeast of Orsk, Orenburg Oblast, Russia,

The base was home to the 750th Training Aviation Regiment between 1953 and 1998 of the Orenburg Higher Military Aviation School of Pilots.

References

Soviet Air Force bases
Russian Air Force bases